Tom Bodkin is the Design Director at The New York Times. Bodkin, who hails from Great Neck, New York, graduated from John L. Miller Great Neck North High School in 1971. Editor-in-chief of the award-winning school newspaper "Guide Post," he started at The New York Times in the 1980s as an Art Director for the Home Section. His career began at CBS where he worked with Lou Dorfsman.

Bodkin is an Assistant Managing Editor and oversees design and layout for the newspaper. His staff include the Art Directors, Designers, Production and Layout desks and he is an important factor in the look and feel of the daily front page. Bodkin also works with his Senior Art Director, Steven Heller. Bodkin was the presiding Design Director during 9-11 and had a large influence on the layout of the front page with the headline 'U.S. Attacked".

Bodkin has been responsible for many of the visual projects at the paper, including introducing the Cheltenham typeface and redesigning the A-Section of the paper. He also led the team that created the Times Reader, a digital version of the newspaper created in collaboration with Microsoft.

References 

The New York Times masthead editors
People from Great Neck, New York
Living people
Great Neck North High School alumni
Year of birth missing (living people)